The Bezirk Salzburg-Umgebung (German, "surrounding area of Salzburg") is an administrative district (Bezirk) in the federal state of Salzburg, Austria, and congruent with the Flachgau region, except for the Statutarstadt of Salzburg, which forms a district of its own.

Area of the district is 1,004.36 km², with a population of 140,914 (January 1, 2009), and population density 140 persons per km². Administrative center of the district is Salzburg.

Administrative divisions 
The district is divided into 37 municipalities, three of them are towns, and six of them are market towns.

Towns 
 Neumarkt am Wallersee (5,420)
 Oberndorf bei Salzburg (5,431)
 Seekirchen am Wallersee (9,344)

Market towns 
 Eugendorf (6,118)
 Grödig (6,638)
 Mattsee (2,850)
 Obertrum (4,208)
 Straßwalchen (6,752)
 Thalgau (6,712)

Municipalities 
 Anif (4,048)
 Anthering (3,108)
 Bergheim (4,839)
 Berndorf bei Salzburg (1,578)
 Bürmoos (4,418)
 Dorfbeuern (1,392)
 Ebenau (1,348)
 Elixhausen (2,681)
 Elsbethen (5,117)
 Faistenau (2,850)
 Fuschl am See (1,334)
 Göming (607)
 Großgmain (2,416)
 Hallwang (3,499)
 Henndorf am Wallersee (4,647)
 Hintersee (460)
 Hof bei Salzburg (3,405)
 Koppl (3,037)
 Köstendorf (2,453)
 Lamprechtshausen (3,140)
 Nußdorf am Haunsberg (2,176)
 Plainfeld (1,131)
 Sankt Georgen bei Salzburg (2,728)
 Sankt Gilgen (3,683)
 Schleedorf (882)
 Seeham (1,677)
 Strobl (3,453)
 Wals-Siezenheim (11,024)
 (population numbers May 15, 2001)

Notable Citizens 
Leopold Kohr was born in Oberndorf near Salzburg.
Andreas Maislinger was born in St. Georgen near Salzburg.
Carl Zuckmayer lived in Henndorf near Salzburg from 1933 to 1938.

Traditions
 The Aperschnalzen is an old tradition of competitive whipcracking.

References

External links 

  Official Touristic Website of Salzburg-Umgebung

 
Districts of Salzburg (state)